The Gefle Ladies Open was a women's professional golf tournament on the Swedish Golf Tour played from 1999 until 2007. It was always held at the Gävle Golf Club in Gävle, Sweden.

Gävle Golf Club had hosted the Gefle Open on the men's Swedish Golf Tour since the tour's inception in 1984, but switched to hosting the women's event starting in 1999. In 2005 the club hosted the Gävle Energi Open on the men's tour instead.

Several installments of the tournament doubled as the women's Swedish International.

Winners

See also
Gefle Open (men's event)

References

Swedish Golf Tour (women) events
Golf tournaments in Sweden
Defunct sports competitions in Sweden
Recurring sporting events established in 1999
Recurring sporting events disestablished in 2007